Shih-Fu Chang is a Taiwanese American computer scientist and electrical engineer noted for his research on multimedia information retrieval, computer vision, machine learning, and signal processing. 

Chang is currently the dean of the School of Engineering and Applied Science of Columbia University, where he is also the Morris A. and Alma Schapiro Professor. He served as the chair of the Special Interest Group of Multimedia (SIGMM) of Association for Computing Machinery (ACM) from 2013 to 2017. He was ranked as the Most Influential Scholar in the field of Multimedia by Aminer in 2016. He was elected as an ACM Fellow in 2017.

Biography

Chang received a bachelor of science in electrical engineering from National Taiwan University in 1985. He received a master of science and a doctor of philosophy in electrical engineering and computer science from the University of California, Berkeley in 1991 and in 1993, respectively.

After receiving his doctorate degree, he joined Columbia University as an assistant professor. He served as the Chair of Electrical Engineering from 2007 to 2010 and received joint appointment in Computer Science in 2011. He served as a co-PI and later as Co-Director of Columbia University’s ADVENT Industry Consortium, which includes more than 25 industry sponsors in the area of media technologies, from 1993 to 2003. He became the Senior Vice Dean (2012-2015) and later Senior Executive Vice Dean (2015-2022) of Columbia's Engineering School, assuming a major role in the School’s efforts in Strategic Planning, Special Research Initiatives, Faculty Development, and International Collaboration. He is currently the dean of Columbia School of Engineering and Applied Science.
Chang is noted for his influential work in multimedia information retrieval, with broad applications in large-scale image/video search, mobile visual search, image authentication, and information retrieval with semi-supervised learning. His research has resulted in more than 10 technology licenses to companies and the creation of three startup companies. As of January 2023, his publications have been cited more than 67,000 times with an h-index of 130.

Awards 

Chang’s notable awards include:
 Member, National Academy of Engineering, 2023
 Member, National Academy of Inventors, 2022
 Academician, Academia Sinica 2018
 Fellow, ACM (Association for Computing Machinery), 2017
 Most Influential Scholar in the Field of Multimedia, 2016
 Honorary Doctorate, University of Amsterdam, 384th Anniversary, 2016
 Great Teacher Award, The Society of Columbia Graduates, 2013
 Technical Achievement Award, IEEE Signal Processing Society, 2012
 Technical Achievement Award, ACM Special Interest Group in Multimedia, 2011
 Fellow, the American Association for the Advancement of Science, 2010
 IEEE Kiyo Tomiyasu Award, 2009
 Fellow, the Institute of Electrical and Electronics Engineers, 2004

Research 

Chang’s research includes multimedia information retrieval, computer vision, machine learning, and signal processing. The primary focus of his work is on development of intelligent methods and systems for extracting information from visual content and multimedia that are prevalent in large archives and live sources. In the early 1990s, his group developed some of the earliest and best-known content-based image search systems, VisualSEEk and VideoQ, which set the foundation of this vibrant area. During last two decades, he has made significant contributions to the field of multimedia retrieval by developing large multimedia ontologies, large libraries of visual concept classifiers, and automatic methods for multimedia ontology construction. These have strongly influenced design of the video search systems used in practice today. He has developed several well-known compact hashing techniques for efficient search over billion-scale image databases. His compact hashing work has enabled order of magnitude speedup and storage reduction in high-profile applications such as an online human trafficking crime fighting system (joint work with Svebor Karaman) that has been deployed in 200+ law enforcement agencies. In addition, he has developed a series of fundamental methods of graph-based semi-supervised learning that successfully address the challenge of training large-scale multimedia retrieval systems with noisy and sparse labels. These methods have been adopted in building the first commercialized brain machine interface system for rapid image retrieval. The graph-based search process, based on the random walk with restart theory, developed jointly with X. Wu and Z. Li, has also been deployed in the large app recommendation system of Huawei (more than 300 million users).

References

External links
 Shih-Fu Chang’s Home Page 
 Columbia Digital Video and Multimedia Lab

Fellow Members of the IEEE
Fellows of the American Association for the Advancement of Science
Columbia University faculty
National Taiwan University alumni
UC Berkeley College of Engineering alumni
IEEE award recipients
Taiwanese electrical engineers
Taiwanese expatriates in the United States
Year of birth missing (living people)
Living people
Fellows of the Association for Computing Machinery
Taiwanese computer scientists
Members of Academia Sinica